In statistics, the Bayesian information criterion (BIC) or Schwarz information criterion (also SIC, SBC, SBIC) is a criterion for model selection among a finite set of models; models with lower BIC are generally preferred. It is based, in part, on the likelihood function and it is closely related to the Akaike information criterion (AIC).

When fitting models, it is possible to increase the likelihood by adding parameters, but doing so may result in overfitting. Both BIC and AIC attempt to resolve this problem by introducing a penalty term for the number of parameters in the model; the penalty term is larger in BIC than in AIC for sample sizes greater than 7.

The BIC was developed by Gideon E. Schwarz and published in a 1978 paper, where he gave a Bayesian argument for adopting it.

Definition 
The BIC is formally defined as

where

 = the maximized value of the likelihood function of the model , i.e. , where  are the parameter values that maximize the likelihood function;
 = the observed data;
 = the number of parameters estimated by the model. For example, in multiple linear regression, the estimated parameters are the intercept, the  slope parameters, and the constant variance of the errors; thus, .

Derivation 
Konishi and Kitagawa derive the BIC to approximate the distribution of the data, integrating out the parameters using Laplace's method, starting with the following model evidence:

where  is the prior for  under model .

The log-likelihood, is then expanded to a second order Taylor series about the MLE, assuming it is twice differentiable as follows:

where  is the average observed information per observation, and  denotes the residual term.

Thus,

where BIC is defined as above, and  either (a) is the Bayesian posterior mode or (b) uses the MLE and the prior  has nonzero slope at the MLE.  Then the posterior

Usage 
When picking from several models, ones with lower BIC values are generally preferred. The BIC is an increasing function of the error variance  and an increasing function of k. That is, unexplained variation in the dependent variable and the number of explanatory variables increase the value of BIC. However, a lower BIC does not necessarily indicate one model is better than another. Because it involves approximations, the BIC is merely a heuristic. In particular, differences in BIC should never be treated like transformed Bayes factors.

It is important to keep in mind that the BIC can be used to compare estimated models only when the numerical values of the dependent variable are identical for all models being compared. The models being compared need not be nested, unlike the case when models are being compared using an F-test or a likelihood ratio test.

Properties 

 The BIC generally penalizes free parameters more strongly than the Akaike information criterion, though it depends on the size of n and relative magnitude of n and k.
It is independent of the prior.
 It can measure the efficiency of the parameterized model in terms of predicting the data.
 It penalizes the complexity of the model where complexity refers to the number of parameters in the model.
 It is approximately equal to the minimum description length criterion but with negative sign.
 It can be used to choose the number of clusters according to the intrinsic complexity present in a particular dataset.
 It is closely related to other penalized likelihood criteria such as Deviance information criterion and the Akaike information criterion.

Limitations 
The BIC suffers from two main limitations
 the above approximation is only valid for sample size  much larger than the number  of parameters in the model.
 the BIC cannot handle complex collections of models as in the variable selection (or feature selection) problem in high-dimension.

Gaussian special case 
Under the assumption that the model errors or disturbances are independent and identically distributed according to a normal distribution and the boundary condition that the derivative of the log likelihood with respect to the true variance is zero, this becomes (up to an additive constant, which depends only on n and not on the model):

 

where  is the error variance. The error variance in this case is defined as

 

which is a biased estimator for the true variance.

In terms of the residual sum of squares (RSS) the BIC is

 

When testing multiple linear models against a saturated model, the BIC can be rewritten in terms of the
deviance  as:

 

where  is the number of model parameters in the test.

See also 

Akaike information criterion
Bayes factor
Bayesian model comparison
Deviance information criterion
Hannan–Quinn information criterion
Jensen–Shannon divergence
Kullback–Leibler divergence
Minimum message length

Notes

References

Further reading

External links 
 Information Criteria and Model Selection
 Sparse Vector Autoregressive Modeling

Model selection
Information criterion
Regression variable selection

de:Informationskriterium